The 1974 Central Dutch football team was an American football team that represented Central College as a member of the Iowa Conference during the 1974 NCAA Division III football season. In their 11th season under head coach Ron Schipper, the Dutch compiled an 11–0 record and won both the Iowa Conference championship and the NCAA Division III national championship.

Linebacker Al Dorenkamp led a defense that allowed an average of only 6.9 points per game and was selected as the most valuable player in the IIAC. Eight Central players received first-team honors on the All-IIAC team: Dorenkamp; offensive linemen Don Knock and Dan Wright; wide receiver Randy Busscher; running back Mike Hodges; quarterback Gary Cutler; defensive lineman Ron Merema; and defensive back Cliff Marlow.

Quarterback Cutler completed 69 of 126 passes for 1,236 yards and 16 touchdowns. His 1974 pass efficiency rating of 174.3 remains a single-season school record (minimum 100 attempts).

Coach Schipper was honored as the 1974 IIAC Coach of the Year. He was inducted in the College Football Hall of Fame in 2000.

The team played its home games at in Pella, Iowa.

Schedule

See also
 Video highlights of the 1974 Stagg Bowl published by Central College

References

Central (IA)
Central Dutch football seasons
NCAA Division III Football Champions
Central Dutch football
College football undefeated seasons